The Opposition in the Australian state of South Australia comprises the largest party or coalition of parties not in Government.  The Opposition's purpose is to hold the Government to account and constitute a "Government-in-waiting" should the existing Government fall. To that end, a Leader of the Opposition and Shadow Ministers for the various government departments question the Premier and Ministers on Government policy and administration, and formulate the policy the Opposition would pursue in Government. It is sometimes styled "His Majesty's Loyal Opposition" to demonstrate that although it opposes the Government, it remains loyal to the King.

The current Leader of the Opposition is South Australian Liberal Party Leader David Speirs, and John Gardner is the Deputy Leader.

Current Shadow Ministry
The current shadow ministry was announced on 21 April 2022. It is led by Opposition Leader David Speirs.

See also
Government of South Australia
Opposition (Australia)

References

Politics of South Australia